Michael Lockwood Crouch (born May 17, 1984 in Austin, Texas) is an American voice actor who specializes in voice acting. He has recorded over 300 audiobooks, through which he received 29 Earphone Awards, 2 Audie Awards, 1 Voice Arts Award, and 1 Odyssey Award honor. In June 2021, AudioFile named him a Golden Voice Narrator. As an actor, he is best known for his roles on the English-language Pokémon and Yu-Gi-Oh! television series.

Biography 
Crouch was born May 17, 1984 in Austin, Texas.  He earned a Bachelor of Fine Arts degree in Musical Theatre from Ithaca College in 2007.

Crouch began narrating audiobooks in 2013. He specializes in voicing young adult characters, LGBT fiction and nonfiction, and Southern American literature.

Crouch presently lives in New York City.

Awards and honors

Awards

"Best of" Lists

Voice acting credits

References

External links 

 Official website

1984 births
Living people
Male actors from Austin, Texas
Ithaca College alumni
21st-century American male actors
Male actors from New York City